East Timor elects on national level a head of state - the president -  and a legislature. The president is elected for a five-year term by the people. The National Parliament (Parlamenta Nacional) has 65 members.

Schedule

Latest elections

Presidential elections

Parliamentary elections

Past elections

Presidential elections

Parliamentary elections

See also
Electoral calendar
Electoral system

References

External links
Adam Carr's Election Archive